Comercial Atlético Clube, commonly known as Comercial, is a Brazilian football club based in Campo Maior, Piauí state. They will compete in the 2011 Copa do Brasil.

History
The club was founded on April 21, 1945. Comercial won the Campeonato Piauiense Second Level in 2004 and 2022, the Campeonato Piauiense in 2010, and they competed in the Copa do Brasil in 2011.

Achievements
 Campeonato Piauiense:
 Winners (1): 2010
 Campeonato Piauiense Second Division:
 Winners (2): 2004, 2022

Stadium
Comercial Atlético Clube play their home games at Estádio Deusdeth de Melo. The stadium has a maximum capacity of 4,000 people.

References

External links
 Official website

Football clubs in Piauí
Association football clubs established in 1945
1945 establishments in Brazil